Beaver Township is a township in 
Grundy County, Iowa, USA. The city of Stout lies within the township, as well as the unincorporated community of Fern.

References

Populated places in Grundy County, Iowa
Townships in Iowa